Colton Dunn (born June 30, 1977) is an American comedian, actor, writer, and producer. He is perhaps best known for his role as Garrett McNeil on the NBC workplace comedy Superstore (2015–2021) and for his work on Comedy Central sketch comedy series Key & Peele (2013–2015), where he served as writer, producer, and occasionally performer throughout its five-season run. Dunn also played Herman in Lazer Team (2015) and its sequel Lazer Team 2 (2017).

Life and career
Born in 1977 in Normal, Illinois, Dunn moved to St. Paul, Minnesota, with his mother, when he was a toddler. While attending St. Paul Central High School, he was involved in theater and joined an improv comedy group. Dunn moved to New York in 1998, and while there, worked for Late Night with Conan O'Brien. He then moved to Los Angeles in 2004.

Prior to working on Key & Peele, Dunn was a writer and performer on madTV, from 2005 to 2009. He has also appeared in Parks and Recreation, Nick Swardson's Pretend Time, Game Shop, Burning Love, a small part on CollegeHumor's "If Google Was a Guy" and co-starred in Superstore on NBC. Dunn hosted the comedy variety show RT-ES, produced by Rooster Teeth Productions, and co-starred in their sci-fi action comedy Lazer Team in 2016.

He is an alumnus of the improvisational comedy group Boom Chicago and has performed and taught at the Upright Citizens Brigade Theatre since 1999.

Dunn has received two Emmy Award nominations for Outstanding Writing for a Variety Series for his work on Key & Peele.

In 2019, Dunn appeared on the podcast Hello From the Magic Tavern as a talking crossbow in the episode "Wizard with a Crossbow". He reprised this role in March 2022 in the season 4 episode "Talking Crossbow Visits".

Filmography

References

External links

 
 
 

1977 births
21st-century American male actors
American comedy writers
American male comedians
American male film actors
American male television actors
American stand-up comedians
American television writers
American male television writers
Living people
Male actors from Illinois
Male actors from Minnesota
Rooster Teeth people
American animated film producers
Comedians from Illinois
Comedians from Minnesota
Upright Citizens Brigade Theater performers
21st-century American comedians
People from Normal, Illinois
People from Saint Paul, Minnesota
21st-century American screenwriters
21st-century American male writers
Television producers from Minnesota